Netria is a genus of moths of the family Notodontidae erected by Francis Walker in 1855.

Selected species
Netria arisemna (Turner, 1931)
Netria bipartita Schintlmeister, 2006
Netria carentis Schintlmeister, 2006
Netria insularis Schintlmeister, 2006
Netria jakli Schintlmeister, 2006
Netria longisacci Schintlmeister, 2006
Netria livoris Schintlmeister, 2006
Netria multispinae Schintlmeister, 2006
Netria palawana Schintlmeister, 2006
Netria speideli Schintlmeister, 2006
Netria torajae Schintlmeister, 2006
Netria viridescens Walker, 1855

References

Notodontidae